The Heart of the City was a £130 million major re-development in Sheffield, England begun in 2004, and completed in 2016 and one of the 12 official quarters of Sheffield City Centre. As its name suggests the Heart of the City is located in the heart of the city centre.

Heart of the City was mainly developed by Sheffield One, an Urban Regeneration Company set up in February 2000 to facilitate the redevelopment. The Heart of the City scheme has created many new public spaces, buildings, and skyscrapers. Subsequent review found that it satisfied many of the goals for a successful city laid out in the "Sheffield First" plan.

Structures part of the scheme
Peace Gardens
Sheffield Town Hall
Tudor Square
St Paul's Place
Millennium Square
Sheffield Winter Gardens
Millennium Gallery
St Paul's Tower
Sheffield City Hall
Barker's Pool
Crucible Theatre
Sheffield Central Library
Lyceum Theatre
Sheffield railway station
Sheaf Square
Velocity Tower
Arundel Gate

References

External links 

  St Paul's Place contains map

Sheffield City Centre
Areas of Sheffield
Redevelopment projects in the United Kingdom